Estonia competed at the 2022 European Championships in Munich from August 11 to August 22, 2022.

Medallists

Competitors
The following is the list of number of competitors in the Championships:

Athletics

Estonia entered 12 athletes.

The following athletes qualified with the entry standard: 
men's marathon: Roman Fosti, Tiidrek Nurme, Kaur Kivistik
men's 400m and 400m hurdles: Rasmus Mägi (withdrew due to an injury)
men's decathlon (maximum of 3 athletes allowed per nation): Karel Tilga, Maicel Uibo, Janek Õiglane, Kristjan Rosenberg (injured), Johannes Erm, Risto Lillemets
women's high jump: Karmen Bruus

The following athletes qualified with their rating: 
men's 100m: Karl Erik Nazarov
men's 110m hurdles: Keiso Pedriks
men's long jump: Hans-Christian Hausenberg
women's 400m hurdles: Marielle Kleemeier
women's javelin throw: Gedly Tugi

Beach volleyball

Estonia has qualified 1 male pair.

Cycling

Estonia sent a team of 6 cyclists: 
Tanel Kangert
Martin Laas
Karl Patrick Lauk
Janika Lõiv
Oskar Nisu
Norman Vahtra

Rowing

Estonia entered 7 rowers. Kaspar Taimsoo in single sculls was replaced by Andrei Jämsä.

Men

Triathlon

References

2022
Nations at the 2022 European Championships
European Championships